There are at least 445 members of the aster and sunflower order, Asterales, found in Montana. Some of these species are exotics (not native to Montana) and some species have been designated as Species of Concern.

Achillea millefolium, common yarrow
Achillea nobilis, noble yarrow
Achillea ptarmica, sneezeweed
Acroptilon repens, Russian knapweed
Adenocaulon bicolor, American trailplant
Ageratina occidentalis, western boneset
Agoseris aurantiaca, orange agoseris
Agoseris glauca, pale agoseris
Agoseris glauca var. dasycephala, pale agoseris
Agoseris glauca var. glauca, pale agoseris
Agoseris grandiflora, large-flower agoseris
Agoseris heterophylla, annual agoseris
Agoseris lackschewitzii, pink agoseris
Agoseris parviflora, steppe agoseris
Almutaster pauciflorus, alkali marsh aster
Ambrosia acanthicarpa, flat-spine bursage
Ambrosia artemisiifolia, annual ragweed
Ambrosia psilostachya, naked-spike ambrosia
Ambrosia tomentosa, skeleton-leaf bursage
Ambrosia trifida, great ragweed
Anaphalis margaritacea, pearly everlasting
Antennaria alpina, alpine pussytoes
Antennaria anaphaloides, tall pussytoes
Antennaria aromatica, aromatic pussytoes
Antennaria corymbosa, meadow pussytoes
Antennaria densifolia, dense-leaved pussytoes
Antennaria dimorpha, low pussytoes
Antennaria howellii, Howell's pussytoes
Antennaria lanata, woolly pussytoes
Antennaria luzuloides, rush pussytoes
Antennaria media, rocky mountain pussytoes
Antennaria microphylla, littleleaf pussytoes
Antennaria monocephala, single-head pussytoes
Antennaria neglecta, field pussytoes
Antennaria parvifolia, Nuttall's pussytoes
Antennaria pulcherrima, showy pussytoes
Antennaria racemosa, racemose pussytoes
Antennaria rosea, rosy pussytoes
Antennaria umbrinella, umber pussytoes
Anthemis arvensis, corn camomile
Anthemis cotula, mayweed
Anthemis tinctoria, golden camomile
Arctium lappa, greater burdock
Arctium minus, lesser burdock
Arnica amplexicaulis, stream-bank arnica
Arnica angustifolia, narrowleaf arnica
Arnica chamissonis, leafy arnica
Arnica cordifolia, heart-leaved arnica
Arnica fulgens, hillside arnica
Arnica latifolia, mountain arnica
Arnica latifolia var. gracilis, smallhead arnica
Arnica longifolia, long-leaf arnica
Arnica mollis, hairy arnica
Arnica parryi, nodding arnica
Arnica rydbergii, subalpine arnica
Arnica sororia, twin arnica
Arnica × diversifolia, rayless arnica
Artemisia absinthium, common wormwood
Artemisia annua, annual wormwood
Artemisia arbuscula, dwarf sagebrush
Artemisia biennis, biennial wormwood
Artemisia campestris, field sagewort
Artemisia campestris subsp. borealis, boreal field sagewort
Artemisia campestris subsp. caudata, field sagewort
Artemisia cana, silver sagebrush
Artemisia cana subsp. cana, silver sagebrush
Artemisia cana subsp. viscidula, silver sagebrush
Artemisia dracunculus, tarragon
Artemisia frigida, fringed sage
Artemisia lindleyana, Columbia River wormwood
Artemisia longifolia, longleaf wormwood
Artemisia longiloba, alkali sagebrush
Artemisia ludoviciana, white sagebrush
Artemisia ludoviciana subsp. candicans, white sagebrush
Artemisia ludoviciana subsp. incompta, white sagebrush
Artemisia ludoviciana subsp. ludoviciana, white sagebrush
Artemisia michauxiana, Michaux's wormwood
Artemisia norvegica, boreal wormwood
Artemisia nova, black sagebrush
Artemisia pedatifida, bird's-foot sagebrush
Artemisia rigida, scabland sagebrush
Artemisia scopulorum, alpine sagebrush
Artemisia spinescens, budsage
Artemisia tilesii, Tilesius wormwood
Artemisia tridentata, big sagebrush
Artemisia tridentata subsp. tridentata, basin big sagebrush
Artemisia tridentata subsp. vaseyana, mountain big sagebrush
Artemisia tridentata subsp. wyomingensis, Wyoming big sagebrush
Artemisia tripartita, three-tip sagebrush
Artemisia tripartita subsp. rupicola, Wyoming threetip sagebrush
Artemisia tripartita subsp. tripartita, threetip sagebrush
Balsamorhiza hookeri, Hooker's balsamroot
Balsamorhiza incana, hoary balsamroot
Balsamorhiza macrophylla, large-leaved balsamroot
Balsamorhiza sagittata, arrowleaf balsamroot
Bellis perennis, lawn daisy
Bidens beckii, beck water-marigold
Bidens cernua, nodding beggarticks
Bidens comosa, three-lobe beggarticks
Bidens frondosa, devil's beggarticks
Bidens vulgata, tall bur-marigold
Brickellia eupatorioides, thoroughwort brickellbush
Brickellia grandiflora, tasselflower brickellbush
Brickellia oblongifolia, mojave brickellbush
Canadanthus modestus, great northern aster
Carduus acanthoides, spiny plumeless-thistle
Carduus nutans, musk thistle
Centaurea cyanus, garden cornflower
Centaurea diffusa, diffuse knapweed
Centaurea jacea, brown starthistle
Centaurea montana, mountain starthistle
Centaurea nigra, black starthistle
Centaurea scabiosa, great starthistle
Centaurea solstitialis, yellow starthistle
Centaurea stoebe, spotted knapweed
Centaurea virgata, squarrose knapweed
Chaenactis alpina, hoary pincushion
Chaenactis douglasii, dusty maiden
Chondrilla juncea, rush skeletonweed
Chrysothamnus viscidiflorus, sticky-leaf rabbitbrush
Cichorium intybus, chicory
Cirsium arvense, Canada thistle
Cirsium brevistylum, short-styled thistle
Cirsium canescens, prairie thistle
Cirsium canovirens, gray green thistle
Cirsium eatonii, Eaton's thistle
Cirsium flodmanii, Flodman's thistle
Cirsium foliosum, leafy thistle
Cirsium hookerianum, hooker thistle
Cirsium longistylum, long-styled thistle
Cirsium pulcherrimum, Wyoming thistle
Cirsium scariosum, meadow thistle
Cirsium subniveum, Jackson Hole thistle
Cirsium undulatum, wavyleaf thistle
Cirsium vulgare, bull thistle
Conyza canadensis, Canada horseweed
Coreopsis tinctoria, golden tickseed
Crepis acuminata, longleaf hawk's-beard
Crepis atribarba, slender hawksbeard
Crepis elegans, elegant hawk's-beard
Crepis intermedia, small-flower hawk's-beard
Crepis modocensis, siskiyou hawk's-beard
Crepis nana, dwarf alpine hawk's-beard
Crepis nicaeensis, Turkish hawksbeard
Crepis occidentalis, gray hawk's-beard
Crepis runcinata, naked-stem hawk's-beard
Crepis runcinata subsp. glauca, fiddleleaf hawksbeard
Crepis runcinata subsp. hispidulosa, fiddleleaf hawksbeard
Crepis runcinata subsp. runcinata, fiddleleaf hawksbeard
Crepis setosa, bristly hawk's-beard
Crepis tectorum, narrowleaf hawk's-beard
Dyssodia papposa, fetid dogweed
Echinacea angustifolia, narrow-leaved purple coneflower
Ericameria discoidea, whitestem goldenbush
Ericameria discoidea var. discoidea, whitestem goldenbush
Ericameria discoidea var. linearis, linear-leaved whitestem goldenbush
Ericameria nana, dwarf goldenweed
Ericameria nauseosa, rubber rabbitbrush
Ericameria parryi, Parry's rabbitbrush
Ericameria parryi var. montana, Parry's mountain rabbitbrush
Ericameria suffruticosa, single-head goldenweed
Erigeron acris, bitter fleabane
Erigeron acris subsp. debilis, bitter fleabane
Erigeron acris subsp. kamtschaticus, bitter fleabane
Erigeron allocotus, Bighorn fleabane
Erigeron asperugineus, Idaho fleabane
Erigeron caespitosus, caespitose fleabane
Erigeron compositus, cutleaf fleabane
Erigeron corymbosus, longleaf fleabane
Erigeron coulteri, Coulter fleabane
Erigeron divergens, spreading fleabane
Erigeron eatonii, Eaton's fleabane
Erigeron evermannii, Evermann fleabane
Erigeron filifolius, threadleaf fleabane
Erigeron flabellifolius, fan-leaved fleabane
Erigeron flagellaris, running fleabane
Erigeron formosissimus, beautiful fleabane
Erigeron glabellus, smooth fleabane
Erigeron glabellus var. glabellus, streamside fleabane
Erigeron glabellus var. pubescens, streamside fleabane
Erigeron gracilis, slender fleabane
Erigeron grandiflorus, large-flower fleabane
Erigeron humilis, low fleabane
Erigeron lackschewitzii, Lackschewitz' fleabane
Erigeron lanatus, woolly fleabane
Erigeron leiomerus, smooth fleabane
Erigeron linearis, linear-leaf fleabane
Erigeron lonchophyllus, short-ray fleabane
Erigeron ochroleucus, buff fleabane
Erigeron ochroleucus var. ochroleucus, buff fleabane
Erigeron ochroleucus var. scribneri, buff fleabane
Erigeron parryi, Parry's fleabane
Erigeron peregrinus, subalpine fleabane
Erigeron philadelphicus, Philadelphia fleabane
Erigeron pumilus, shaggy fleabane
Erigeron radicatus, taprooted fleabane
Erigeron rydbergii, Rydberg's fleabane
Erigeron simplex, one-stem fleabane
Erigeron speciosus, aspen fleabane
Erigeron strigosus, daisy fleabane
Erigeron subtrinervis, three-nerve fleabane
Erigeron tener, slender fleabane
Erigeron tweedyi, tweedy's fleabane
Erigeron ursinus, bear river fleabane
Eriophyllum lanatum, common woolly-sunflower
Eriophyllum lanatum var. integrifolium, common woolly sunflower
Eriophyllum lanatum var. lanatum, common woolly-sunflower
Eucephalus elegans, elegant aster
Eucephalus engelmannii, Engelmann's aster
Eupatorium maculatum, spotted joepye-weed
Eupatorium occidentale, western joepye-weed
Eurybia conspicua, showy aster
Eurybia glauca, gray aster
Eurybia integrifolia, thick-stem aster
Eurybia merita, subalpine aster
Eurybia sibirica, arctic aster
Euthamia graminifolia, flat-top fragrant goldenrod
Euthamia occidentalis, western fragrant goldenrod
Evax prolifera, big-head evax
Filago arvensis, field fluffweed
Gaillardia aristata, great blanket-flower
Galinsoga quadriradiata, fringed quickweed
Gnaphalium macounii, Macoun's cudweed
Gnaphalium microcephalum, white cudweed
Gnaphalium palustre, western marsh cudweed
Gnaphalium purpureum, purple cudweed
Gnaphalium stramineum, cotton-batting cudweed
Gnaphalium uliginosum, low cudweed
Grindelia howellii, Howell's gumweed
Grindelia nana, Idaho gumweed
Grindelia squarrosa, curlycup gumweed
Gutierrezia sarothrae, broom snakeweed
Helenium autumnale, common sneezeweed
Helenium hoopesii, orange sneezeweed
Helianthella quinquenervis, nodding rockrose
Helianthella uniflora, Rocky Mountain rockrose
Helianthus annuus, common sunflower
Helianthus maximiliani, Maximillian sunflower
Helianthus nuttallii, Nuttall's sunflower
Helianthus pauciflorus, stiff sunflower
Helianthus petiolaris, prairie sunflower
Helianthus × laetiflorus, hybrid prairie sunflower
Heterotheca villosa, hairy golden-aster
Heterotheca villosa var. depressa, low golden aster
Heterotheca villosa var. foliosa, hairy false goldenaster
Heterotheca villosa var. minor, hairy false goldenaster
Heterotheca villosa var. villosa, hairy false goldenaster
Hieracium albiflorum, white-flower hawkweed
Hieracium aurantiacum, orange hawkweed
Hieracium caespitosum, meadow hawkweed
Hieracium gracile, alpine hawkweed
Hieracium praealtum, kingdevil
Hieracium scouleri, Scouler's hawkweed
Hieracium scouleri var. albertinum, Albert's hawkweed
Hieracium scouleri var. griseum, hound's-tongue hawkweed
Hieracium scouleri var. scouleri, Scouler's hawkweed
Hieracium umbellatum, narrowleaf hawkweed
Hulsea algida, alpine hulsea
Hymenopappus filifolius, fine-leaved hymenopappus
Hymenopappus filifolius var. luteus, yellowish hymenopappus
Hymenopappus filifolius var. polycephalus, manyhead hymenopappus
Hymenoxys acaulis, stemless four-nerve-daisy
Hymenoxys grandiflora, old-man-of-the-mountain
Hymenoxys richardsonii, Richardson's bitterweed
Hymenoxys torreyana, Torrey bitterweed
Hypochaeris radicata, hairy cat's-ear
Ionactis alpina, lava aster
Ionactis stenomeres, Rocky Mountain aster
Iva axillaris, small-flowered marsh-elder
Iva xanthifolia, coarse sumpweed
Lactuca biennis, tall blue lettuce
Lactuca canadensis, Canada lettuce
Lactuca ludoviciana, western lettuce
Lactuca serriola, prickly lettuce
Lactuca tatarica, tartarian lettuce
Lagophylla ramosissima, slender hareleaf
Lapsana communis, common nipplewort
Leucanthemum vulgare, oxeye daisy
Liatris ligulistylis, Rocky Mountain blazing star
Liatris punctata, dotted blazing star
Lorandersonia linifolia, spearleaf rabbitbrush
Lygodesmia juncea, rush skeleton-plant
Machaeranthera canescens, hoary tansy-aster
Machaeranthera grindelioides, rayless tansy-aster
Machaeranthera pinnatifida, spiny goldenaster
Machaeranthera tanacetifolia, tanseyleaf tansy-aster
Madia exigua, little tarweed
Madia glomerata, mountain tarweed
Madia gracilis, grassy tarweed
Madia minima, small-headed tarweed
Malacothrix torreyi, desert dandelion
Matricaria discoidea, pineapple-weed chamomile
Matricaria maritima, false chamomile
Microseris nutans, nodding microseris
Nothocalais cuspidata, prairie false-dandelion
Nothocalais nigrescens, black hairy false-dandelion
Nothocalais troximoides, sagebrush false dandelion
Onopordum acanthium, scotch thistle
Oreostemma alpigenum, anderson's aster
Petasites frigidus, arctic sweet coltsfoot
Petasites frigidus var. frigidus, arctic sweet coltsfoot
Petasites frigidus var. sagittatus, arrowleaf sweet coltsfoot
Picradeniopsis oppositifolia, oppositeleaf false bahia
Platyschkuhria integrifolia, basin daisy
Pleiacanthus spinosus, spiny skeletonweed
Prenanthes racemosa, glaucous rattlesnake-root
Prenanthes sagittata, arrow-leaf rattlesnake-root
Psilocarphus brevissimus, dwarf woolly-heads
Psilocarphus elatior, tall woolly-heads
Pyrrocoma carthamoides, large-flower goldenweed
Pyrrocoma carthamoides var. carthamoides, large-flower goldenweed
Pyrrocoma carthamoides var. subsquarrosa, beartooth large-flowered goldenweed
Pyrrocoma integrifolia, entire-leaf goldenweed
Pyrrocoma lanceolata, lance-leaved goldenweed
Pyrrocoma uniflora, plantain goldenweed
Ratibida columnifera, prairie coneflower
Rudbeckia hirta, blackeyed susan
Rudbeckia laciniata, cut-leaved coneflower
Rudbeckia occidentalis, western coneflower
Saussurea americana, American saw-wort
Saussurea densa, dwarf saw-wort
Saussurea weberi, Weber's saw-wort
Scorzonera laciniata, mediterranean serpent-root
Senecio amplectens, clasping groundsel
Senecio canus, woolly groundsel
Senecio congestus, marsh ragwort
Senecio conterminus, northwestern groundsel
Senecio crassulus, thick-leaf groundsel
Senecio cymbalarioides, cleft-leaf groundsel
Senecio debilis, weak groundsel
Senecio dimorphophyllus, two-leaf ragwort
Senecio dimorphophyllus var. dimorphophyllus, twoleaf ragwort
Senecio dimorphophyllus var. paysonii, Payson's groundsel
Senecio elmeri, Elmer's ragwort
Senecio eremophilus, desert groundsel
Senecio fremontii, Fremont's ragwort
Senecio fuscatus, twice-hairy butterweed
Senecio hydrophiloides, sweet marsh ragwort
Senecio hydrophilus, alkali-marsh ragwort
Senecio indecorus, elegant groundsel
Senecio integerrimus, entire-leaf ragwort
Senecio integerrimus var. exaltatus, Columbia ragwort
Senecio integerrimus var. integerrimus, lambstongue ragwort
Senecio integerrimus var. scribneri, Scribner's ragwort
Senecio jacobaea, tansy ragwort
Senecio lugens, black-tip groundsel
Senecio megacephalus, large-headed ragwort
Senecio pauciflorus, few-flowered butterweed
Senecio pauperculus, balsam ragwort
Senecio plattensis, prairie ragwort
Senecio pseudaureus, western golden groundsel
Senecio serra, tall groundsel
Senecio sphaerocephalus, rough-head groundsel
Senecio streptanthifolius, Rocky Mountain groundsel
Senecio triangularis, arrow-leaf groundsel
Senecio vulgaris, common groundsel
Senecio werneriifolius, rock groundsel
Solidago canadensis, Canada goldenrod
Solidago canadensis var. gilvocanescens, Great Plains goldenrod
Solidago canadensis var. salebrosa, rough Canada goldenrod
Solidago gigantea, giant goldenrod
Solidago missouriensis, Missouri goldenrod
Solidago mollis, velvety goldenrod
Solidago multiradiata, Rocky Mountain goldenrod
Solidago nana, baby goldenrod
Solidago nemoralis, field goldenrod
Solidago ptarmicoides, prairie goldenrod
Solidago rigida, stiff goldenrod
Solidago simplex, sticky goldenrod
Solidago velutina, three-nerved goldenrod
Sonchus arvensis, field sowthistle
Sonchus arvensis subsp. arvensis, field sowthistle
Sonchus arvensis subsp. uliginosus, field sowthistle
Sonchus asper, spiny-leaf sowthistle
Sonchus oleraceus, common sowthistle
Sphaeromeria argentea, chicken-sage
Sphaeromeria capitata, rock-tansy
Stenotus acaulis, stemless mock goldenweed
Stenotus armerioides, thrift mock goldenweed
Stenotus lanuginosus, woolly goldenweed
Stenotus lanuginosus var. andersonii, woolly goldenweed
Stenotus multicaulis, many-stem goldenweed
Stephanomeria runcinata, desert wirelettuce
Stephanomeria tenuifolia, narrowleaf wirelettuce
Symphyotrichum ascendens, western aster
Symphyotrichum boreale, boreal aster
Symphyotrichum campestre, western meadow aster
Symphyotrichum ciliatum, rayless alkali aster
Symphyotrichum ciliolatum, fringed blue aster
Symphyotrichum eatonii, Eaton's aster
Symphyotrichum ericoides, white heath aster
Symphyotrichum falcatum, white prairie aster
Symphyotrichum foliaceum, leafy-bracted aster
Symphyotrichum foliaceum var. apricum, alpine leafy-bract aster
Symphyotrichum foliaceum var. cusickii, Cusick's aster
Symphyotrichum foliaceum var. foliaceum, leafy-bract aster
Symphyotrichum foliaceum var. parryi, Parry's aster
Symphyotrichum hendersonii, henderson's aster
Symphyotrichum laeve, smooth blue aster
Symphyotrichum lanceolatum, white panicle aster
Symphyotrichum molle, soft aster
Symphyotrichum oblongifolium, aromatic aster
Symphyotrichum spathulatum, western mountain aster
Symphyotrichum subspicatum, Douglas's aster
Symphyotrichum welshii, Welsh's aster
Tanacetum balsamita, coastmary
Tanacetum parthenium, feverfew
Tanacetum vulgare, common tansy
Taraxacum ceratophorum, Rocky Mountain dandelion
Taraxacum erythrospermum, redseed dandelion
Taraxacum lyratum, alpine dandelion
Taraxacum officinale, common dandelion
Tetradymia canescens, gray horsebrush
Tetradymia spinosa, short-spine horsebrush
Thelesperma megapotamicum, hopi-tea
Thelesperma subnudum, border goldthread
Tonestus aberrans, Idaho goldenweed
Tonestus lyallii, Lyall's goldenweed
Tonestus pygmaeus, pygmy goldenweed
Townsendia condensata, cushion townsend-daisy
Townsendia exscapa, silky townsend-daisy
Townsendia florifera, showy townsend-daisy
Townsendia hookeri, Hooker's townsend-daisy
Townsendia incana, hoary townsend-daisy
Townsendia leptotes, slender townsend-daisy
Townsendia montana, Wyoming townsend-daisy
Townsendia parryi, Parry's townsend-daisy
Townsendia spathulata, sword townsend-daisy
Tragopogon dubius, meadow goat's-beard
Tragopogon porrifolius, purple goat's-beard
Tragopogon pratensis, meadow goat's-beard
Triniteurybia aberrans
Verbesina encelioides, golden crownbeard
Vernonia fasciculata subsp. corymbosa, fascicled ironweed
Viguiera multiflora, many-flowered viguiera
Wyethia amplexicaulis, northern mule's-ears
Wyethia helianthoides, white-head mule's-ears
Wyethia scabra, rough mule's ears
Xanthium spinosum, spiny cocklebur
Xanthium strumarium, rough cocklebur
Xylorhiza glabriuscula, woody aster

Further reading

See also
 List of dicotyledons of Montana

Notes

Montana
Asterales